Alexis Pillet-Will, full name Hyacinthe-Louis-Alexis-Constantin Pillet-Will, (1805 – 9 April 1871) was a 19th-century French banker.

Career 

In 1834 he married Louise Roulin (1802–1878) who held a salon and for whom Gioachino Rossini composed the Petite messe solennelle in 1863 at the suggestion of her husband Alexis.

Their son, would in turn become director of the Caisse d'épargne de Paris in 1871 and regent of the Banque de France.

While Michel-Frédéric Pillet died leaving a legacy of 15 million francs . (11 million once removed interest income), Alexis raised them to 23 million eleven years later.

References 

French bankers
People from Lausanne
1805 births
1871 deaths
Regents of the Banque de France